U.S. Route 400 (US 400) is a  mostly east–west U.S. Highway, commissioned in 1994. The highway's western terminus is in Granada, Colorado, at an intersection with US 385. The highway's eastern terminus is southwest of Joplin, Missouri, near Loma Linda, at an interchange with Interstate 44, with which it shares with US 166. It originally ended in Garden City, Kansas; in 1996 it was extended to its current western terminus.

Route description
The route number does not follow the numbering convention for U.S. Highways established by the American Association of State Highway and Transportation Officials. The number 400 implies the route is a spur of U.S. Route 0, which does not exist.

Colorado
US 400 begins in Granada at an intersection with US 385. It then runs concurrently with US 50 through Holly east to the Kansas border.

Kansas

US 400 and US 50 enter Kansas west of Coolidge. They run concurrently through Garden City, where it intersects US 83 and separate at Dodge City, which is where it intersects US 56 and US 283. It continues southeast from Dodge City and first intersects US 54 at Mullinville.

US 400 and US 54 begin a long concurrency at Mullinville which passes through Greensburg, Pratt and Kingman before entering Wichita. While in Wichita, US 400 and US 54 intersect Interstate 235 and the concurrency of US 81 and Interstate 135. K-96 provides a short freeway connection to Interstate 35, which is also the Kansas Turnpike. At Augusta, US 400 and US 54 enter into another concurrency with US 77, and US 400 breaks from this concurrency at Haverhill.

US 400 continues east through several small towns before turning southeast to go through the Fredonia area and intersecting US 75 at Neodesha. After a brief concurrency with US 75, it turns east, first intersecting U.S. Route 169 near Morehead and then US 59 near Parsons before finally intersecting US 69 south of Pittsburg. It then turns south with US 69 and at Crestline, follows US 69A south to Riverton. US 400 then turns east with US 166 at Baxter Springs and the two highways run concurrently eastward into Missouri.

The entire  section of US 400 in Cimarron is maintained by the city.

Missouri
US 400, along with US 166, terminates at I-44 about one mile (1.6 km) east of the Kansas-Missouri state line, three miles (5 km) west of Joplin.

History

US 400 was first established on December 1, 1994, and at that time ran from the east end of the US-50 and US-83 overlap, eastward to the east county line of Cherokee County, Kansas.

In a May 3, 1995 resolution, it was approved to move US-400 and K-96 to a new alignment between northwest of Fredonia and Neodesha, at that time the overlap with K-47 was removed. In a December 3, 1998 resolution, it was approved to truncate K-96 to end at US-400 by Wichita.

U.S. Route 154
A section of U.S. 400 that ran from Dodge City to Mullinville, Kansas was U.S. Route 154 from 1926 to 1982. It later became K-154 before becoming part of U.S. 400.

Construction on the first section of the East Kellogg improvement project started in August 2015. The project included a redesigned intersection with Webb Road and widened US-54 and US-400 from four lanes to six lanes from Webb Road to Greenwich Road. Construction on a second project began in 2016, to continue widening the highway to a six-lane freeway between Greenwich Road and K-96. Also new bridges will be built over I-35/KTA, new ramps will be constructed from southbound I-35/KTA to westbound US-54/US-400 and from eastbound US-54/US-400 to both northbound and southbound I-35/KTA. In addition, two-lane one way frontage roads on each side of the freeway will be built. Construction for both projects should be completed by late 2021. A two-mile section of the new highway, from Eastern Street to the K-96 junction, opened on November 21, 2019. On April 16, 2020, vandals damaged an estimated $50,000 worth of construction equipment, which included a bulldozer, excavator and an off-road vehicle.

Major intersections

See also
U.S. Route 412
U.S. Route 425

Notes

References

External links

 Kansas Highway Maps: Current, Historic, KDOT
Sanderson, Dale End of U.S. Highway 400 (with maps of US 400 and related routes)

00-4
00-4
00-4
00-4
Transportation in Prowers County, Colorado
Transportation in Hamilton County, Kansas
Transportation in Kearny County, Kansas
Transportation in Finney County, Kansas
Transportation in Gray County, Kansas
Transportation in Ford County, Kansas
Transportation in Kiowa County, Kansas
Transportation in Pratt County, Kansas
Transportation in Kingman County, Kansas
Transportation in Sedgwick County, Kansas
Transportation in Butler County, Kansas
Transportation in Greenwood County, Kansas
Transportation in Wilson County, Kansas
Transportation in Montgomery County, Kansas
Transportation in Cherokee County, Kansas
Transportation in Crawford County, Kansas
Transportation in Newton County, Missouri